ALHOSN University is an educational institution founded in 2005 and located in Abu Dhabi, the capital city of the United Arab Emirates. It is a segregated University with separate campuses for Male and Female Students. The Abu Dhabi-based university is accredited by the UAE Ministry of Higher Education and Scientific Research.

ALHOSN University offers 18 undergraduate and 11 postgraduate degrees under three faculties, Business, Engineering and Arts and Social Science. The University offers programs in the fields of Engineering (Accreditation Board for Engineering and Technology, (ABET) accredited)  Business (Association of Certified Chartered Accountants (ACCA) accredited) and Education. Undergraduate academic degrees are offered as four-year programs and taught in English, all except for the Arabic education component. ALHOSN University is a member of the Arab Association of Universities.

The University’s City Campus is located in Abu Dhabi and has students from 41 different nationalities and Faculty and Staff hailing from 33 different countries.

In 2017, Ministry of Education in UAE have placed the university on probation and closed the University in 2021.

Web-based services

The University uses the Moodle system for e-learning.

References

2005 establishments in the United Arab Emirates
Educational institutions established in 2005
Universities and colleges in the Emirate of Abu Dhabi
Education in Abu Dhabi
Buildings and structures in Abu Dhabi